The Saint Who Forged a Country is a 1942 Mexican film directed by Julio Bracho and starring Ramon Novarro, Domingo Soler, and Gloria Marín. It was released under the English title in English in 1944. The title refers to the appearances of the Virgin Mary in colonial Mexico as Our Lady of Guadalupe.

References

External links
 

1942 films
Mexican drama films
1942 drama films
Mexican black-and-white films
1940s Mexican films